Melvin Clodfelter (June 26, 1904 – January 19, 1983) was an American wrestler. He competed in the men's freestyle lightweight at the 1932 Summer Olympics.

References

1904 births
1983 deaths
American male sport wrestlers
Olympic wrestlers of the United States
Wrestlers at the 1932 Summer Olympics
People from Logan County, Oklahoma